Liotina crenata is a species of sea snail, a marine gastropod mollusk in the family Liotiidae.

Description
The diameter of the shell is 15 mm. The depressed shell has a turbinate shape. The spire whorls are somewhat exserted, all showing a pair of peripheral keels, which are strongly, or subsipinosely crenulated. The whorls are encircled by a spiral series of granules above. The base of the shell is smooth. The umbilicus is of a moderate size, defined by a riblet. The peristome is strongly crenately varicose. The color of the shell is whitish, stained with chestnut.

Distribution
This species occurs in the Indian Ocean off the Aldabra Atoll; in the Pacific off the Philippines.

References

 Taylor, J.D. (1973). Provisional list of the mollusca of Aldabra Atoll.

crenata
Gastropods described in 1839